Tamworth Borough Council elections are held three years out of every four, with a third of the council elected each time. Tamworth Borough Council is the local authority for the non-metropolitan district of Tamworth in Staffordshire, England. Since the last boundary changes in 2002, 30 councillors have been elected from 10 wards.

Political control
The town of Tamworth had been a municipal borough from 1836 to 1974 with a borough council. The first elections to the borough with its revised powers under the Local Government Act 1972 were held in 1973, initially operating as a shadow authority until the new arrangements came into effect on 1 April 1974. Political control of the council since 1974 has been held by the following parties:

Leadership
The leaders of the council since 2006 have been:

Council elections
1973 Tamworth Borough Council election
1976 Tamworth Borough Council election (New ward boundaries)
1978 Tamworth Borough Council election
1979 Tamworth Borough Council election
1980 Tamworth Borough Council election
1982 Tamworth Borough Council election
1983 Tamworth Borough Council election
1984 Tamworth Borough Council election
1986 Tamworth Borough Council election
1987 Tamworth Borough Council election (New ward boundaries)
1988 Tamworth Borough Council election
1990 Tamworth Borough Council election
1991 Tamworth Borough Council election
1992 Tamworth Borough Council election
1994 Tamworth Borough Council election
1995 Tamworth Borough Council election
1996 Tamworth Borough Council election
1998 Tamworth Borough Council election
1999 Tamworth Borough Council election
2000 Tamworth Borough Council election
2002 Tamworth Borough Council election (New ward boundaries)
2003 Tamworth Borough Council election
2004 Tamworth Borough Council election
2006 Tamworth Borough Council election
2007 Tamworth Borough Council election
2008 Tamworth Borough Council election
2010 Tamworth Borough Council election
2011 Tamworth Borough Council election
2012 Tamworth Borough Council election
2014 Tamworth Borough Council election
2015 Tamworth Borough Council election

Borough result maps

By-election results

1993-1997

1997-2001

2001-2005

2005-2009

References

External links
Tamworth Borough Council
By-election results

 
Council elections in Staffordshire
District council elections in England